Zulema María Eva Menem (Arabic :زوليما ماريا إيفا منعم) (born 25 December, 1970) is an Argentine politician who replaced her mother in the role of First Lady after the latter separated from her father, President of Argentina Carlos Menem. Menem was born in La Rioja Province.

To avoid confusion with her mother Zulema Fátima Yoma, since both could be called "Zulema Menem", the media refers to her as Zulemita.

Biography 
Zulemita initially appeared in gossip magazines as the daughter of the President. She began to perform protocol work after her parents divorced. Zulemita accepted the first lady role. She received decorations from the kings of Spain and Sweden.

Zulemita broke her relationship with her father after his marriage to Chilean Cecilia Bolocco. This marriage affected her inheritance due to the subsequent birth of Máximo Saul Menem.

External links

References

1970 births
Living people
People from La Rioja Province, Argentina
Argentine people of Syrian descent
Argentine people of Arab descent
Zulema
First ladies and gentlemen of Argentina
Daughters of national leaders